Dreier is a family name of German origin.

People with the last name Dreier include:

David Dreier, member of the United States House of Representatives
Hannah Dreier, American journalist
Hans Dreier, art film director
John Caspar Dreier, United States diplomat and academic
Katherine Dreier, painter and art collector
Marc Stuart Dreier, American lawyer convicted of fraud
Thomas Dreier, American author and businessman

See also
Dreyer (disambiguation)